Hypermart USA was a demonstrator project operated by Walmart in the 1980s and 1990s, which attempted to combine groceries and general merchandise under one roof at a substantial discount. The hypermart concept was modeled after earlier efforts from other retailers, notably French retailers such as Auchan and Carrefour, and the Midwestern big retailer Meijer.

All stores used a floorplan that exceeded . They featured a mini-mall, food court, arcade, bank, and other kiosk operations. The ones in Kansas City and Topeka featured McDonald's, Subway, and Popeyes Louisiana Kitchen in their food courts.

History 
The prototype did not go as well as planned. Walmart was unaccustomed to operating such massive stores, and an economic recession had brought on a decline in retail sales. Although the stores were profitable, sales projections were too optimistic and the company did not anticipate the great heating and cooling costs, the resistance of customers towards parking and congestion issues.

The first Walmart Supercenter, which used a floorplan in the  range, was opened in 1988 in Washington, Missouri. As the Supercenter proved to be a much more profitable experiment, Walmart renamed the stores "Wal-Mart's Hypermart USA" in April 1990, and eventually began either converting them to Supercenter operations or closing them.

The Hypermart USA concept was officially discontinued in 2000, when Walmart announced it was converting the Kansas City Hypermart USA into a Walmart Supercenter. The former Kansas City store, then a Supercenter, ultimately closed in January 2007. The original Hypermart in Garland, Texas closed in May 2008. The Topeka, Kansas, hypermarket, located on Southwest Wanamaker Road, is still open, although its exterior has been remodeled as well as the Arlington, Texas, location on South Cooper Street.

Locations

Garland, Texas
Garland, Texas (December 28, 1987)

This location was converted several years later to a Walmart Supercenter and lost its Hypermart USA branding.  By May 2008, Walmart announced it would replace this store with a smaller Supercenter nearby.  In October 2017, it was announced that the city of Garland would buy the vacant site with intentions of redeveloping it as a "gateway" to the city.  It was demolished in the summer of 2018.

Topeka, Kansas
Topeka, Kansas (January 1988)

, the Topeka, Kansas store is still operating as a Walmart Supercenter.

Arlington, Texas
Arlington, Texas (August 1988)

, the Arlington, Texas, Hypermart is still operating as a Walmart Supercenter.

Kansas City, Missouri
The Kansas City, Missouri, location opened on February 20, 1990. Located just northeast of the now-closed Bannister Mall in the Benjamin Plaza development, the South Kansas City store was the last Hypermart USA to open. Described as Walmart's "mall without walls," the Kansas City Hypermart included a number of restaurants and specialty outlets in addition to the combination grocery and general merchandise discount store. 
Food court with seating for 200 people, with quick service restaurants including Taco John's, Corn Dog 7, V's Pasta Parlor, Torre's Pizzeria, Oasis (ice cream, shakes, and frozen yogurt), Subway, and McDonald's. 
United Missouri City Bank
Hypermart Pharmacy
Aladdin's Castle arcade
Cost Cutters, family hair salon
Family Vision Center
Travel Center Ltd.
Hearing Today Laboratory
ShoeSmith
1-Hour Photo-Mart
American Studios, Inc, portrait studio
HyperSound and Video

In May 2000, Walmart announced it would spend $4.9 million to convert the Kansas City Hypermart USA to a Walmart Supercenter. Walmart indicated that it was converting its last remaining Hypermart, because the stores were too big and too inconvenient for customers. Walmart explained that the effort of offering everything under one roof was more of a European style of retail, and it was overwhelming to the American shopper. Kansas City Councilman Chuck Eddy claimed that there were other reasons for the failure of the Kansas City Hypermart. Eddy cited a high volume of complaints from residents about the store, including time-consuming lines at checkout counters, trash and runaway carts in the parking lot, dirty restrooms, and overall messy conditions and poor management. Walmart wanted to build a new Supercenter store in South Kansas City on State Line Road near 135th Street, so city leaders pressured Walmart to make improvements to the conditions of the Hypermart location before they would be given approval to move forward with the new South Kansas City store. At the time, Walmart said it would cost almost $5 million to renovate the  Hypermart store. Walmart moved forward with the renovation and conversion of the Hypermart store, along with bringing in new management to address the concerns of poor management at the store. In 2006, Walmart began construction on a new Walmart Supercenter on the site of the former Blue Ridge Mall. The new Supercenter was to be the first of Walmart's new "high-efficiency" stores. As a result of the new Supercenters on State Line Road and the former Blue Ridge Mall site, along with declining business and a growing number of retail closings in Bannister Mall and Benjamin Plaza, Walmart announced that it would close former Hypermart store in mid-January 2007. The 400 employees were offered jobs at the new Blue Ridge store and other area Walmart stores. After 7 years of vacancy, the former Kansas City Hypermart was demolished in 2014 along with much of the surrounding vacant retail developments as part of a large redevelopment project.

References

Further reading 
 Walmart Replaces former Garland Hypermart location with the company's first Hispanic Community Store

Defunct retail companies of the United States
Walmart
Retail companies disestablished in 2000
Retail companies established in 1987
Companies based in Garland, Texas
1987 establishments in Arkansas
2000 disestablishments in Arkansas